Horatio Walpole, 2nd Earl of Orford (13 or 24 June 1752 – 15 June 1822), styled The Honourable Horatio Walpole between 1757 and 1806 and Lord Walpole between 1806 and 1809, was a British peer and politician.

Background
Orford was the son of Horatio Walpole, 1st Earl of Orford, son of Horatio Walpole, 1st Baron Walpole of Wolterton, brother of Prime Minister Robert Walpole, 1st Earl of Orford. His mother was Lady Rachel, daughter of William Cavendish, 3rd Duke of Devonshire. He gained the courtesy title Lord Walpole when the earldom of Orford was revived in favour of his father in 1806.

Political career
Orford was elected Member of Parliament for Wigan in 1780, a seat he held until 1784, and then represented King's Lynn between 1784 and 1809. The latter year he succeeded his father in the earldom and entered the House of Lords.

Family
Lord Orford was twice married. He married firstly Sophia, daughter of Charles Churchill, in 1781. After her death in 1797, he married secondly Catherine, daughter of Reverend James Tunstall, in 1806. She died the following year. Lord Orford survived her by 15 years and died in June 1822. He was succeeded in the earldom by his son, Horatio.

References

1752 births
1822 deaths
Earls in the Peerage of the United Kingdom
Members of the Parliament of Great Britain for English constituencies
British MPs 1780–1784
British MPs 1784–1790
British MPs 1790–1796
British MPs 1796–1800
Members of the Parliament of the United Kingdom for English constituencies
UK MPs 1801–1802
UK MPs 1802–1806
UK MPs 1806–1807
UK MPs 1807–1812
UK MPs who inherited peerages
Politics of the Metropolitan Borough of Wigan
Horatio
Earls of Orford